The Madagascar flufftail (Sarothrura insularis) is a species of bird in the family Sarothruridae.
It is endemic to Madagascar.

Its natural habitat is subtropical or tropical moist lowland forests.

References

Madagascar flufftail
Endemic birds of Madagascar
Madagascar flufftail
Taxonomy articles created by Polbot